Bordj El Kiffan (Arabic 'برج الكيفان') is a suburb of the city of Algiers in northern Algeria. It is in the eastern section of the city, near Matares Beach.

Named Fort de l'Eau (Fr. 'Water Fortress') under French rule prior to 1962, used to be a famous beach resort within the Bay of Algiers, complete with luxury hotels and a casino.

Pollution from urbanization, nearby industrialization, and untreated sewage affected the status, and the beach was no longer popular since the late 1970s. The urban location, however, preserved some of its former recreational status.

Today situated directly north (i.e. towards the Mediterranean sea) of the close-by Algiers' Houari Boumedienne international airport, with direct highway connection from the capital.

Notable people

References

Communes of Algiers Province
Cities in Algeria